Birra Menabrea is an Italian brewing company located in Biella, Piedmont. Under this label - distributed since the early nineties by Birra Forst, but owned by the Thedy family (heir of the founders of the company) - around 100 thousand hectolitres of beer are produced annually, part of which for export to twenty countries.

Related products 

Sbirro is a cheese made with the Menabrea beer.

References

External link

External links 

Menabrea UK

Beer brands of Italy
Beer in Italy
Companies based in Piedmont
Biella